
Bacino di Val Malvaglia (or Lago di Malvaglia) is a lake above Malvaglia in the canton of Ticino, Switzerland. The reservoir's surface area is 0.19 km2. Its arch dam was built in 1959 and is operated by Officine Idroelettriche di Blenio SA (Ofible).

See also
List of mountain lakes of Switzerland

External links
Swiss Dams: Malvaglia
Ofible: Bacini pericolosi

Lakes of Ticino
Reservoirs in Switzerland
Arch dams